Television network, play-by-play and color commentator(s) for the Sugar Bowl from 1953 to the present.

Television
Starting with the 2010–11 season, ESPN started airing the games, out bidding FOX for the rights to the games.

Spanish

In 2013, ESPN Deportes provided the first Spanish U.S. telecast of the Sugar Bowl.

Portuguese

In 2015, ESPN Brasil did the broadcast of the game in Brazilian Portuguese.

Radio

Local radio

References

External links
 Ratings/viewership for the Sugar Bowl since '96

Sugar
Broadcasters
Sugar Bowl
Sugar Bowl
Sugar Bowl
Sugar Bowl
Sugar Bowl